Natalie Cammile Adams (born September 11, 1991) is an American competition swimmer who specializes in butterfly events.  She represented the United States in the 200-meter butterfly event at the 2012 Summer Olympics and the 2016 Summer Olympics in the same event.

Career
She was born in Houston, Texas, and graduated from Cypress Woods High School in Cypress, Texas.

Adams attended Texas A&M University in College Station, Texas, where she swam for the Texas A&M Aggies swimming and diving team in National Collegiate Athletic Association (NCAA) competition from 2011 to 2014.  In four years of swimming for the Aggies, she has won four Big 12 individual championships in the 200-yard butterfly, 500-yard freestyle, and 400-yard individual medley (twice).  At the 2012 NCAA Women's Swimming and Diving Championships, she finished second in the 200-yard butterfly and was recognized as an All-American. As a senior, Adams won the 200-yard butterfly at the 2014 NCAA Women's Swimming and Diving Championships.

At the 2012 United States Olympic Trials in Omaha, Nebraska, the U.S. qualifying meet for the Olympics, Adams made the U.S. Olympic team for the first time by winning the 200-meter butterfly.  Adams also competed in the 400-meter individual medley at the trials, and finished third with a time of 4:38.62.  At the 2012 Summer Olympics in London, she finished fifth in the finals of the women's 200-meter butterfly.

At the 2016 Summer Olympics in Rio on August 10, she finished fourth in the finals of the women's 200-meter butterfly with a career best time of 2:05.90.

See also
 List of Texas A&M University people
 Texas A&M Aggies

References

External links
 
 
 
 
 
 Cammile Adams – Texas A&M University athlete profile at AggieAthletics.com

1991 births
Living people
American female butterfly swimmers
Olympic swimmers of the United States
Sportspeople from Houston
Swimmers at the 2012 Summer Olympics
Swimmers at the 2016 Summer Olympics
Texas A&M Aggies women's swimmers
World Aquatics Championships medalists in swimming